John Archibald (25 August 1895 – 1967) was a Scottish professional football goalkeeper who played in the Football League for Darlington, Grimsby Town and Newcastle United. He also played in the Scottish League for St Bernard's, Albion Rovers, East Stirlingshire and Clydebank.

Personal life 
Archibald was the younger brother of footballer Bobby Archibald. During the First World War, Archibald served in the Royal Field Artillery and saw action at Gallipoli.

Career statistics

Honours 
Grimsby Town

 Football League Third Division North: 1925–26

References

1895 births
Scottish footballers
Newcastle United F.C. players
Chelsea F.C. players
Grimsby Town F.C. players
Darlington F.C. players
English Football League players
Association football goalkeepers
1967 deaths
British Army personnel of World War I
Royal Field Artillery soldiers
Scottish Football League players
Albion Rovers F.C. players
Reading F.C. players
St Bernard's F.C. players
East Stirlingshire F.C. players
Clydebank F.C. (1914) players
Footballers from South Lanarkshire
People from Strathaven